Predrag Gosta (Cyrillic: Предраг Госта) is a Serbian-American conductor, harpsichordist, and baritone.

Life and career
Predrag Gosta was born in Belgrade, Yugoslavia (present day Serbia), on 14 January 1972. His father was born to Serbian and German parents in Vojvodina and his mother to a large Croatian family in Herzegovina. He studied at the Belgrade Music Academy, London's Trinity College of Music, Georgia State University in Atlanta (USA), as well as the University of Oxford. He is the Artistic Director of an early music ensemble and baroque orchestra New Trinity Baroque, and the Music Director and conductor of the Gwinnett Ballet Theatre based in Atlanta, United States; the President of the international early music society Early Music Network. From 1991 to 1996 he was the Artistic Director of the Studio for Early Music Belgrade and the Belgrade International Early Music Festival. Since the festival's renewal in 2012 Maestro Gosta has been serving again as its Artistic Director. The Festival has since grown to one of the largest and most successful early music festivals in southern Europe - in 2017 it received an Award from the classical music magazine Muzika klasika as the best festival for classical music in Serbia, while Maestro Gosta received the Artist of the Year award from the Association of Musical Artists. Predrag Gosta is also the Artistic Director of the Belgrade Baroque Academy, which he founded in 2013 and co-directed until 2019 with Serbian-born contralto Marijana Mijanović.

Between 2008 and 2009 he was the Assistant Conductor of the National Philharmonic in Washington, D.C. Since 2010 he is the President of the Makris Foundation in Washington D.C. and the Makris Music Society. He is also an Artistic Advisor and U.S. Director of Peter the Great Music Academy in St. Petersburg, Russia. In 2014 Gosta established the New Belgrade Opera, which is focused on baroque opera. In 2015 he became the Music Director of the New Symphony Orchestra of Belgrade, which now bears the name of the Greek-American composer Andreas Makris and is now known as the Makris Symphony Orchestra. In 2019, under this orchestra, he founded a new international competition for conductors, where he acts as the President of the Jury.

Predrag Gosta has recorded several critically acclaimed CDs, including recording of Henry Purcell's opera Dido and Aeneas with British soprano Evelyn Tubb, and recording of Rachmaninoff's Symphonic Dances and Mussorgsky's Pictures at an Exhibition with the London Symphony Orchestra. Other musicians he collaborated with include baroque violinists Florian Deuter, Ilia Korol and John Holloway, Baroque harpist Andrew Lawrence-King, lutenists Anthony Rooley and Michael Fields, Dutch recorder virtuoso Marion Verbruggen, harpsichordists Steven Devine and Ottaviano Tenerani, Italian countertenor Carlo Vistoli, Serbian contralto Marijana Mijanovic, Polish mezzo-soprano Magdalena Wór and others, as well as orchestras and theatre houses such as the London Symphony Orchestra, the Russian National Orchestra in Moscow, the State Hermitage Orchestra in St. Petersburg, the St. Petersburg State Capella Glinka, the Belgrade Philharmonic Orchestra, the Theatre of Biel-Solothurn Theatre, the Belgrade National Theatre and the Madlenianum Opera-Theatre, opera theatres in Ruse, Burgas and Stara Zagora (Bulgaria) and others. He appeared at the festivals such as the Boston Early Music Festival and Piccolo Spoleto (USA), Varazdin Baroque Evenings and Korkyra Baroque (Croatia), Budva Theatre City (Montenegro) and many others.

Predrag Gosta also served the affiliate guest lecturer at Georgia State University in Atlanta, and as a choir professor and artist-in-residence at Oxford College of Emory University in Oxford, Georgia, USA.

Discography and videography

Reviews
Mitridate, re di Ponto (Theater Solothurn 2018)

"...Der Eindruck, den die Produktion hervorruft, wäre nicht so nachhaltig, wenn sich nicht eine Riege von Könnern in ihren Dienst gestellt hätte. Das beginnt mit dem sehr beachtlichen Dirigat des Barockspezialisten Predrag Gosta, der bereits bei "Lucio Silla" vor einem Jahr eine Stimme veranlasst hatte, bei seinem Eintritt in den Orchestergarben nach der Pause "Bravo Maestro!" zu rufen. Dieser Ruf sei hiermit für "Mitridate" nachgeholt... Das Sinfonie Orchester Biel Solothurn, erfahren mit dem Stil des jungen Mozart, spielt engagiert, wach und federnd und führt die Zuhörer zu den überraschenden Schönheiten der Komposition mit der Beiläufigkeit souveräner Maestria. Das Orchester in Mailand kann nicht anders geklungen haben als das der Premiere in Solothurn. Jedenfalls nicht besser..." — Der Stimme der Kritik (Michel Schaer) 14 April 2018

Orfeo (New Belgrade Opera / Madlenianum)

"The Award for the Best Concert Performance in 2017 goes to "L'Orfeo" by Monteverdi, presented by the New Belgrade Opera and Opera-Theatre Madlenianum on November 18, 2017, conducted by Maestro Predrag Gosta." — Musica Classica 06 February 2018

Lucio Silla (Theater Solothurn 2017)

"...Das Sinfonie-orchester Biel-Solothurn unter der Leitung von Predrag Gosta lässt die Frische dieses selten gespielten Dreiakters in reichen Schattierungen erklingen und wirkt selbst nach zwei Stunden unverbraucht..." — Berner Zeitung (Peter Wäch) 25 April 2017

"...Dirigent Predrag Gosta dirigiert Mozarts Frühwerk leichtfüssig und so klug ausgehorcht, dass man die Ohren gar nicht tief genug in den Orchestergraben hineinstecken kann. Das Sinfonieorchester Biel Solothurn nimmt Gostas Ideen begeistert auf..." — NZZ am Sonntag (Christian Berzins), Zürich 30 April 2017

Piccolo Spoleto Festival 2011

"Each piece... was polished and sparkled like something new. The playing was technically elegant and warmed by loving interpretation infused with infectious personality..." — CVNC: An Online Arts Journal in North Carolina, June 2011

Bach's B-minor Mass

"...a thoughtful, energizing exception that gave the B-minor Mass a fresh sound. Under New Trinity founder and conductor Predrag Gosta, they illuminated the various madrigal-like choruses and operatic arias with individual attention... Emotionally heartfelt... strong performance... Saturday night at St. Bartholomew's Episcopal, which was filled to capacity... It's a special pleasure to hear a student choir sing at a high level with enthusiasm and clarity of purpose. ...The four vocal soloists were often compelling, more so in duets with the fine instrumentalists... Conductor Gosta kept it all pushing forward... His tempos were not overly fast, but they felt fleet and he ended sections with a crisp cutoff — a very pleasant sensation. The Serbian-born harpsichordist and conductor is audibly gaining in interpretive heft, in parallel with his nascent conducting career, from the Gwinnett Ballet to concerts in Russia and Eastern Europe..." — ArtsCriticAtl.com, March 2011

White Nights Festival 2010 with the State Capella Symphony Orchestra of St. Petersburg

"... the concert was a brilliant and unforgettable event of this season... The orchestra responded not only to every gesture and every movement of the conductor - it seemed that even their breaths were united. Predrag Gosta knew how to achieve a true creative atmosphere in the hall..." — St. Petersburg Times, Russia, June 30, 2010

Purcell's "Dido & Aeneas"

"...An excellent 2002 Edition Lilac recording [of Purcell's "Dido & Aeneas"] featuring Predrag Gosta leading the Atlanta-based Chorus and Orchestra of New Trinity Baroque... This is a wonderfully colorful yet always musical performance. It is what Noorman attempted but failed in the Parrott recording. Gosta's ensemble is excellent... the playing is so sensitive and secure. The choral work is excellent, too, with a true sense of character projected by the nameless witches, sailors, and attendants. This self-produced recording... is definitely well worth acquiring – a true sleeper... That's nine recordings of Dido and Aeneas and I haven't even scratched the surface. Which one is best? ...If I was forced to take one recording to a desert island, it would be the one by Lieberson and McGegan – but I would be sure to have Tubb with Gosta and Graham with Haim in my iPod." — Early Music America magazine, Fall 2009

References

External links 
Predrag Gosta's web site
New Trinity Baroque's web site
Gwinnett Ballet Theatre's web site
Makris Symphony Orchestra's web site
Makris International Conducting Competition's web site
Makris Foundation's web site
New Belgrade Opera's web site
Belgrade Baroque Academy's web site
Belgrade International Early Music Festival's web site
Edition Lilac's web site
Early Music Network's web site

Living people
1972 births
Serbian conductors (music)
Croatian conductors (music)
Male conductors (music)
American male conductors (music)
Serbian emigrants to the United States
Musicians from Belgrade
Serbian people of Bosnia and Herzegovina descent
Alumni of Trinity College of Music
Georgia State University alumni
21st-century American conductors (music)
21st-century American male musicians
Alumni of the University of Oxford